Mabel Newcomer  (1892–1983) was an economics professor at Vassar College from 1917-1957. She also taught courses in finance and corporations. Newcomer was known among the Vassar economics department as the best "tax man" during her time there.

Life 
 Lifespan was 91 years from 1892 to 1983.
 She retired from Vassar College in 1957.
 In 1958 she moved to Saratoga, California.

Education
Newcomer bachelor's (1913) and master's (1914)' degrees in economics are from Stanford University.
Newcomer completed a fellowship at Columbia University for her doctoral dissertation.

Career

Timeline 
Newcomer was a professional economist. Newcomer taught at Vassar College, Columbia University, Stanford University, and at the University of Chicago throughout her career.
 1917–1917: Newcomer completed research and gained a part-time job at Barnard
 1917–1957: Newcomer taught in the Economics department of Vassar College
 1926: Newcomer officially became a professor
 Mid-1940s: Newcomer prepared a grant proposal for the Carnegie Foundation
 1921–1926: Newcomer was a special investigator to the New York Joint Commission on Taxation and Retrenchment
 1922–1923: Newcomer was and economist for the educational finance inquiry
 1925: Newcomer was a special investigator for the Regional Plan of New York
 1928: Newcomer was appointed Assistant to Columbia Professor Robert Haig
 1931: Newcomer was an investigator for home ownership for President Hoover as well as serving under Governor Franklin D. Roosevelt to study rural life restoration
 1934: Newcomer gained a Social Science Research Council ward for the comparative distribution of tax funds by central governments to local in Germany and England
 1935–1936: Newcomer joined the New York State Commission 
 1935-1937: Newcomer served as an Associate Director of the 20th Century fund
 1937: Newcomer was a tax consultant, Advisory Commission on Education for the New York State Joint commission (Fiscal policies)
 1939–1945: Newcomer was a consultant to the U.S. Treasury throughout WWII.
 1944: Newcomer was the only American women at the United Nations Conference at Bretton Woods
 1946–1947: Newcomer was a Chief Consultant for the Taxation and Revenue Office of the U.S. military government in Berlin
 1958: Newcomer moved to Saratoga, California.
Newcomer was also heavily involved with the National Boards of the League of Women Voters, American Association of University Women, [Teacher's Insurance and Annuity Association, American Association of University Professors Council, and was even elected vice-president of the American Economic Association.

Bretton Woods Conference 

Mabel Newcomer was one of the American delegates to attend the Bretton Woods Conference. While at the conference, she was a member of the first Committee of the first Commission, and first Committee of the second Commission. Those Committees were responsible for deciding upon the Purposes, Policies, and Quotas of the International Monetary Fund; and the World Bank.

She was one of two women that were present at the conference, with the other being Mrs. L.J. Gouseva from the USSR. The decision to include Newcomer as a member of the American delegation is a debated issue, as there is disagreement on why she was chosen. There are some sources which say that Eleanor Roosevelt had required there to be at least one female in the American delegation, and that she was especially chosen as she was one of the Roosevelt's neighbors and had taught Secretary of Treasury Henry Morgenthau Jr's daughter. To further support this claim are the reports that while at the Bretton Woods Conference, Newcomer spent more time going rock-climbing than in the meetings. Despite this, documents from the time also show how she was recommended by the Committee on Participation of Women in Post-War Planning with two other women as candidates for representatives of the United States at the Bretton Woods Conference, which was given to Secretary of State Cordell Hull. Furthermore, Newcomer was one of two non-governmental delegates at the conference, and of those she was the only to be in the field of academics. Despite this, the American delegation was selected so it would be easiest to convince the Presidential administration, Congress, and businessmen and scholars of the necessity of the Bretton Woods Agreements. As such, Newcomer was expected to promote the Bretton Woods Conference to her fellow women and academics.

There is not much written on Newcomer's involvement on the decision-making at the Bretton Woods Conference, except on the decision concerning the Fund Quota and Bank Subscription for the Soviet Union. In that, she believed that it was better for the United States to pay additional money for the Bank Subscription of the Soviet Union so that they did not leave the conference or weaken the agreements made at the conference. In addition to her impacts during the conference, Newcomer was also a proponent of the agreements created after the conference's passing. She made a number of speeches and writings in favor of the Bretton Woods Conference.

Award 
Newcomer was awarded the AAUW's Achievement Award in 1953. This was the first time a social scientist had won. Newcomer was also awarded an Honorary Degree from Russell Sage College.

Bibliography
, Review printed in American Political Science Review, Vol 32, no. 2.
 Kirkus Review: A Century of Higher Education for Women, Harper. Archived  9, Dec 1959. Retrieved 30, Jan 2017.

References

External links

20th-century American economists
Vassar College faculty
1892 births
1983 deaths
Stanford University alumni